Fabricio Leonel Poci (born 10 April 1986 in Buenos Aires), is an Argentinian former footballer who last played as a midfielder for Iraklis Larissa.
He came in Greece in 2008 and played for 3rd division team Asteras Rethimno. A year later he joined another Cretan football team, Platanias, where he managed to play 2.5 years. On 22 December 2011, he signed a 1.5 years contract with Greek Football League club AEL, but managed to play only 15 games for 1,5 season because of a serious injury (rupture of the medial cruciate ligament) that kept him off pitch for almost 4 months. In June 2013, he returned to Crete, this time for Chania, who had just been promoted to the second division.

External links
 Crimson Scorer 
 E.P.A.E.
 F.L.News
 F.L.News Poci to Chania FC

1986 births
Living people
Argentine footballers
Argentine expatriate footballers
Association football midfielders
Cypriot First Division players
Athlitiki Enosi Larissa F.C. players
Ayia Napa FC players
Expatriate footballers in Greece
Expatriate footballers in Cyprus
Footballers from Buenos Aires